Abdul Latif Mirza (died 5 November 2007) was a Bangladeshi Awami League politician. He was the member of parliament from Pabna-4 in 1979 and Sirajganj-4 in 1996.

Career 
Mirza was a member of Mukti Bahini and fought in the Bangladesh Liberation War. He had formed the Mirza Abdul Latif Bahini which had 8 to 10 thousand personnel during the war. He had started the force 15 members and seven rifles. He had initially named it Polashdanga Youth Camp. He was elected to Sirajganj-4 constituency (Ullapara).

Death
Mirza died on 5 November 2007 in Sirajganj.

References

2007 deaths
Awami League politicians
Mukti Bahini personnel
Jatiya Samajtantrik Dal politicians
2nd Jatiya Sangsad members
7th Jatiya Sangsad members